Roman Valeryevich Kagazezhev (born 31 March 1980) is a retired Russian professional football player.

External links
 

1980 births
People from Velikiye Luki
Living people
Russian footballers
Association football midfielders
Russian Premier League players
Russian expatriate footballers
Expatriate footballers in Kazakhstan
Expatriate footballers in Latvia
Expatriate footballers in Belarus
Russian expatriate sportspeople in Kazakhstan
Russian expatriate sportspeople in Latvia
FC Dynamo Moscow players
FC Dynamo Moscow reserves players
FC Kuban Krasnodar players
FC Arsenal Tula players
FC Khimki players
FC Vostok players
FK Ventspils players
FC Baltika Kaliningrad players
FC Vitebsk players
Sportspeople from Pskov Oblast